Múgica is one of the 113 municipalities of Michoacán, in central Mexico. The municipal seat lies at Nueva Italia. The municipality was originally created on February 12, 1942 as the municipality of Zaragoza then changed to the current name on December 9, 1969.

Localities 
The municipality has 52 localities. The largest are:

References

Municipalities of Michoacán